SafeMoon LLC is a cryptocurrency and blockchain company created in March 2021. The company also has a SafeMoon token (SFM) which trades on the BNB Chain blockchain. The token charges a 10% fee on transactions, with 5% redistributed (or reflected) to token holders and 5% directed to wallets in a different currency, Binance Coin (BNB), controlled by the coin's authors. The token reached its all time high market cap in April 2021 of $17b. As of December 2022, it has since dropped 98.7% in value to $223m.

The SafeMoon company has released a minimal-function cryptocurrency wallet and has announced plans to release other cryptocurrency products. The company and the token have been the subject of several controversies since conception; by being compared to a "ponzi-scheme", not delivering on products, having multiple class-action lawsuits filed against them, and facing serious fraud allegations.

History

2021: SafeMoon version 1
SafeMoon was released in March 2021. A compound of "Safe" and "Moon". The token was released with the slogan of landing "Safely to the moon", derived from the slang phrase used in the cryptocurrency community; "To the moon" which is used to describe a crypto token "to quickly rise in price".  The token had no utility and team when it was launched. Upon release, Vice reported that between March 14 and April 21 of 2021, SafeMoon increased in value by 23,225% following celebrity endorsements from musicians Lil' Yachty and Nick Carter, YouTuber Logan Paul, social media hype, new exchange listings, and retail investors. At that time, Vice said that "cryptocurrencies like SafeMoon still have no real-world use." These celebrities were later sued by many SafeMoon investors as part of a class-action lawsuit branding SafeMoon to be a part of a pump and dump scheme. After the substantial rise in price, the unknown developers of the token appointed Braden John Karony as the CEO of Safemooon and registered as a Limited liability company with aims of providing utility to the token. Before this appointment, Karony served as a former analyst for the United States Department of Defense from January 2015 to January 2021.

In May 2021, SafeMoon announced making a presentation to The Gambia to provide "technology for innovation and learning purposes". The project was dubbed "Project " (the misspelling of Phoenix being intentional), SafeMoon released a familiar crypto pitch of serving the "unbanked" and claimed to be working with local governments to adopt the token as a local currency. A company run by John Karony's mother ECG LC, was set up in May 2021 to deliver this project. On August 27, 2022, John stated that his reasons for discontinuing his work in West Africa were due to supply chain problems, which is disputed by his mother in the ongoing Project  lawsuit.

In June 2021, the project began beta testing of the SafeMoon wallet. The app was officially released on Google Play in September 2021 and the App Store in October 2021. Critics dubbed the wallet to be a copy of the Trust Wallet owned by Binance. Thomas Smith, who was the CTO for Safemoon, left the company in December 2021 for a role as a blockchain advisor for StrikeX, however, was dismissed by the company after the fraud allegations uncovered by Stephen Findeisen.

2022: Migration to SafeMoon V2
In December 2021, SafeMoon developed Version 2 of their token (SafeMoon V2), an updated version of the SafeMoon contract. As part of consolidating to V2, the SafeMoon team implemented a deadline to migrate their tokens, or else investors would be faced with a 100% tax. The team also released a decentralised exchange titled "Safemoon Swap" as the only place where this migration could happen. In April 2022, Safemoon announced a new product, the Safemoon card. The Safemoon card was promoted as a debit card that can be used to pay for goods using SafeMoon (and other cryptocurrencies) for a 2.5% fee. Some experts criticized paying an additional fee to pay for goods, contrasting it to Crypto.com's card which instead rewards users with a percentage return in crypto depending on how much of their native token they are holding. Although the card was supposed to be released in July 2022, as of December 2022 its release has been delayed.

Since the appointment of Karony in 2021, SafeMoon has announced plans to launch its own cryptocurrency exchange by October 2021, however, this was pushed to December 2022 and has again been pushed back to the end of 2023. The company also has plans to launch a blockchain, hardware wallet, and to become a macro Internet of things infrastructure on its own blockchain.

Criticisms and legal issues

Parallels to a meme coin
The token has been described pejoratively in May 2021 as a "meme coin" alongside Dogecoin and Shiba Inu, with much of its value attributed to the result of the 2021 crypto market frenzy.

The developers of SafeMoon have been described as having "little proof of previous success", with the token having been described by some financial experts as "the furthest thing from safe" and that it "doesn't do anything".

Security issues
In May 2021, the V1 version of the token was audited by security auditing firm CertiK, which identified a "major issue" that the project's owners have "control over tokens funded by SafeMoon's seller fee". An owner address acquire's the liquidity pool tokens generated by the Safemoon-BNB pool. This gives the owner control over tokens funded by Safemoon's seller fee. This feature was later the subject of the 2022 Safemoon fraud allegations. London Capital's head of research Jasper Lawler also noted that the Manual Burn aspect of Safemoon paired with the controlling companies' large stake in the coins opens the project up to manipulation by the project controllers.

Ponzi-scheme comparisons
After the price of a SafeMoon token multiplied by 12x during a single week in April 2021, opinion columnists in various financial magazines likened SafeMoon to a ponzi scheme or pyramid scheme, where gains to early investors were paid only by incoming investors who expected a similar rate of return, with some citing the fact that each transaction sends a portion of the transacted value to existing holders of the token, as well as a portion of the transacted value to a wallet controlled by the coin's authors. Furthermore, Safemoon's token economics utilises a 10% sell tax. This means that for every $1000 sale, an investor would be charged $100. Many critics argue that this discourages investors to sell as they are at a loss as soon as they invest. The tax from the new investors is used for many things including distributing a small percentage of it to existing investors.

2022 fraud allegations

In April 2022,  Stephen "Coffeezilla" Findeisen, a prominent independent researcher who investigates crypto scams accused the SafeMoon team for misappropriating millions of dollars. According to Findeisen, Safemoon CEO Karony, has been removing funds from the liquidity pool which is the primary explanation of the crypto's price pattern (Figure 1). Findeisen found evidence of transactions which showed Safemoon's liquidity wallet moving funds to a wallet dubbed the "Gabe (6abe) wallet" which withdrew funds to a separate company run by John Karony. Former SafeMoon CTO; Thomas "Papa" Smith was the only person who responded to Findeisen's claims stating that funds were taken from the “locked liquidity pool” before Karony’s appointment. He sent Smith evidence of this in the form of a blockchain transaction showing an outflow of 36.7 trillion tokens from the liquidity pool, dated March 5, 2021.

Class-action lawsuits
On February 18, 2022, in a class-action lawsuit filed against the SafeMoon that alleged the company is a pump and dump scheme, Paul was named as a defendant along with musician Nick Carter, rappers Soulja Boy and Lil Yachty, and social media personality Ben Phillips for promoting the SafeMoon token on their social media accounts with misleading information. On the same day, the U.S. 11th Circuit Court of Appeals ruled in a lawsuit against Bitconnect that the Securities Act of 1933 extends to targeted solicitation using social media. Findeisen, who had just shone a light on the 2022 SafeMoon fraud allegations supported the claims that Paul and Phillips were pumping and dumping Safemoon tokens during this time which saw a decline of 96% in token price. On August 22, 2022, it was documented that David Portnoy, who was also a defendant in this case, was dismissed from the lawsuit after it was revealed that he never received any compensation from Safemoon for promoting the token and that he also lost his investment from buying SFM.

In May 2022, multiple SafeMoon investors filed another class action lawsuit against SafeMoon for security fraud. The lawsuit which is represented by Scott+Scott, was voluntarily terminated by the plaintiff without prejudice per notice in November 2022. This means the case can be retried if the plaintiff wishes to in the future.

Project Pheonix lawsuit
As part of Project , a separate company Emanations Communications Group LC (ECG) was set up and led by Safemoon CEO John Karony's mother, Jennifer, to provide antenna technology to The Gambia. The company has since been seized by Lex Vest Ltd. As part of this venture, John invested $5 million into the project in June 2021. It was claimed that Karony funded this investment from Safemoon's liquidity pool which was supposedly locked up. As part of this capital investment John agreed 33.34% stake in the company & future profits, as well as his own personal bills, to come out of the company. ECG determined that John Karony created too many regulatory risks and that due to multiple lawsuits filed against him and his company (Safemoon), were uncomfortable accepting any more capital investments from him. As a result, John Karony filed a lawsuit against ECG for breach of contract and accused his mother of legal trickery to remove him from ECG.

ECG developed technology relating to Project  which was presented to John in December 2021. According to court documents, John had been disclosing information about developing technology for the benefit of SafeMoon to make claims on SafeMoon’s website and social media accounts about the technology. He was counselled not to do so by ECG (particularly his mother) because of potential adverse effects on pending patents and other intellectual property. In March 2022, John and his counsel met with Project  partners Sankung Jawara and Pa Alieu Jawara, and offered them an upfront payment of $350,000 to cut Jennifer Karony out of the transaction, which they refused. John then negotiated an offer to pay them of up to $4.5 million, to be paid out over time, with the understanding that Jennifer was again removed from consideration. Sankung and Pa Alieu once more refused, due to the proposed circumvention of the business partnership and John's assertion that there was a way to circumvent the legal and parliamentary procedures required for John's desired bank project.

Karony's mother stated that John had not provided a plan for Project  and was not interested in the content of the financial documents, but was looking for "opportunities to take pictures of the lab to substantiate his published claims of owning ECG labs which he called 'Area 32' or 'DarkMoon'". Due to the lawsuit, Project  has since been abandoned. On August 27, 2022, John stated that his reasons for discontinuing his work in West Africa were due to supply chain problems, which is disputed by his mother.

See also 
 Decentralized finance
 Meme coin
 Binance Smart Chain

References

External links
 

2021 software
Cryptocurrency projects
Computer-related introductions in 2021
Currencies introduced in 2021
Bitcoin exchanges
American companies established in 2021
Bitcoin companies
Digital currency exchanges